Neti Neti (Sanskrit : नेति नेति) is a Sanskrit expression which means "not this, not that", or "neither this, nor that" ( is sandhi from  "not so"). It is found in the Upanishads and the Avadhuta Gita and constitutes an analytical meditation helping a person to understand the nature of the Brahman by negating everything that is not Brahman. One of the key elements of Jnana Yoga practice is often a "neti neti search." The purpose of the exercise is to negate all objects of consciousness, including thoughts and the mind, and to realize the non-dual awareness of reality.

Significance of neti neti

Neti neti, meaning, "Not this, not this", is the method of Vedic analysis of negation. It is a keynote of Vedic inquiry.  With its aid the Jnani negates identification with all things of this world which is not the Atman, in this way he negates the Anatman (Not-Self). Through this gradual process he negates the mind and transcends all worldly experiences that are negated till nothing remains but the Self. He attains union with the Absolute by denying the body, name, form, intellect, senses and all limiting adjuncts and discovers what remains, the true "I" alone. L.C.Beckett in his book, Neti Neti, explains that this expression is an expression of something inexpressible, it expresses the ‘suchness’ (the essence) of that which it refers to when ‘no other definition applies to it’. Neti neti negates all descriptions about the Ultimate Reality but not the Reality itself. Intuitive interpretation of uncertainty principle can be expressed by "Neti neti" that annihilates ego and the world as non-self (Anatman), it annihilates our sense of self altogether.

Adi Shankara was one of the foremost Advaita philosophers who advocated the neti-neti approach. In his commentary on Gaudapada’s Karika, he explains that Brahman is free from adjuncts and the function of neti neti is to remove the obstructions produced by ignorance. His disciple, Sureshvara, further explains that the negation, neti neti, does not have negation as its purpose, it purports identity. The sage of the Brihadaranyaka Upanishad II iii 1-6, beginning with there are two forms of Brahman, the material and the immaterial, the solid and the fluid, the Sat ‘being’ and tya, ‘that’ of Satya – which means true, denies the existence of everything other than Brahman. And therefore, there exists no separate entity like Jiva which Shankara states is the reflection of Brahman in Avidya (ignorance).

"Here, then, is the rule of substitution: 'not , not ,' for there is nothing beyond the 'not.'" BU II iii 6

"About this self, one can only say 'not , not .'" BU IV v 15

Another explanation is in the book Introduction to the Vedārthasangraha of Sri Ramanujacharya by S. S. Raghavachar based on the Vishishtadvaita view:

This implies an extremely interesting aspect of the various possibilities an entity can go through. The fact that a person didn't know the alphabet as a baby is true, but whether s/he will not know it even as an adult depends on the person, who being nothing else but the manifestation of Brahman can become the causation to manifest into a highly literate person or illiterate, whichever personality the person desired for, subject to Karma/causality which is nothing else but Brahman again; Brahman itself being the cause of all Karma.

Avadhuta Gita
The following was extracted from Avadhuta Gita 1.25 on Wikisource:
Sanskrit in Devanagari:
तत्त्वमस्यादिवाक्येन स्वात्मा हि प्रतिपादितः ।
नेति नेति श्रुतिर्ब्रूयाद अनृतं पाञ्चभौतिकम् ।। २५।।

IAST:
tattvamasyādivākyena svātmā hi pratipāditaḥ /
neti neti śrutirbrūyād anṛtaṁ pāñcabhautikam //25//

By such sentences as "That thou art," our own Self is affirmed. Of that which is untrue and composed of the five elements - the Sruti (scripture) says, "Not this, not this."

See also
Anatta
Apophatic theology
Buddha-nature
Dharmadhatu
Dharmakāya
Fana (Sufism)
I Am that I Am
Kenosis
Mahavakya
Para Brahman
Śūnyatā
Tathātā
Ta'til

References

Hindu philosophical concepts
Hindu mysticism
Ontology
Hindu mantras